Igor Primorac, also Igor Primoratz (born on October 6, 1945, in Moscow), is a Croatian philosopher of Russian origin who is occupied with ethics, philosophy of sex, and philosophy of law. He teaches at the Faculty of Philosophy in Zagreb and other universities. He publishes his scholarly works mostly in English.

Works
Some of his major works include:
 Prestup i kazna (1978.)
 Banquov duh (Banquos Geist, 1986.)
 Kazna, pravda i opće dobro (1989.)
 Primoratz, Igor. Ethics and Sex. London ; New York : Routledge, 1999.
 Filozofija na djelu: Rasprave i ogledi iz praktičke filozofije (2001.)
 Etika na djelu, 2006.
 (ed.) Human Sexuality, 1997.
 (ed.) Suvremena filozofija seksualnosti (Contemporary Philosophy of Sexuality), 2003., KruZak, Zagreb
 Primoratz, Igor. "Sexual Morality: Is Consent Enough?". Ethical Theory and Moral Practice. September 2001, Volume 4, Issue 3, pp 201–218.

Literature
  Entry "Primorac, Igor" in the Croatian Encyclopedia

1945 births
Philosophers of sexuality
Croatian philosophers
Croatian people of Jewish descent
Croatian people of Russian descent
Living people
Academic staff of the University of Zagreb